Latvala is a Finnish surname. Notable people with the surname include:

 Chris Latvala (born 1981), American politician, member of the Florida House of Representatives
 Dick Latvala (1943–1999), American tape archivist
 Hanna-Maari Latvala (born 1987), Finnish sprinter
 Jack Latvala (born 1951), American politician, member of the Florida Senate
 Jan Latvala (born 1972), Finnish professional ice hockey defenceman 
 Jari-Matti Latvala (born 1985), Finnish rally driver 
 Matti Latvala (1868–1964), Finnish farmer and politician, member of the Parliament of Finland 1909–1917 and 1919–1922
 Mikko Latvala (born 1980), Finnish pole vaulter
 Roope Latvala (born 1970), Finnish guitarist
 Sini Latvala (born 1980), Finnish hammer thrower

Finnish-language surnames